Střemy is a municipality and village in Mělník District in the Central Bohemian Region of the Czech Republic. It has about 500 inhabitants.

Administrative parts
The village of Jenichov is an administrative part of Střemy.

References

Villages in Mělník District